Roberto Iniesta Ojea (born May 16, 1962), also known as Robe; is a Spanish songwriter, singer and guitarist. He was the frontman of the rock band Extremoduro and is currently active as a solo artist.

Biography
Roberto Iniesta Ojea was born on 16 May 1962 in Plasencia. After having left school with a third class Baccalaureate, he worked with his father. At the age of twenty he began writing songs and he formed his first band, Dosis Letal.

In 1987, he formed Extremoduro, the band that brought him fame. They didn't have enough money for recording a studio album so they sold tickets that would be exchanged for the album. When they sold 250 tickets they had earned enough money to afford the recording. In January 1989 they started the recording of their first demo tape.
The distribution of the demo tape began to attract attention inside and outside their home region of Plasencia; it was so well received that the Catalan television program Plastic invited them for a live performance.

In 1996 he shot to fame in a massive way in Spain due to the release of Agila. That same year he received the news of the death of his father. The entrance to the band of guitarist and producer Iñaki "Uoho" Antón, at that time belonging to rock and roll band Platero y Tú, was a turning point in the history of the band. They toured along with Platero y Tú that year.

He also joined Fito Cabrales (from Platero y Tú), Iñaki Antón to form the supergroup Extrechinato y Tú. After five years of recording sessions, playing music inspired by lyrics written by urban poet Manolo Chinato, finally the album Poesía Básica was released in 2001.

In 2006 he created the record label Muxik along with Iñaki Antón.

He wrote his first novel, El viaje íntimo de la locura, which was released on 28 September 2009. The novel sold 10000 copies in just over a week.

Discography

As a solo artist
 Lo que aletea en nuestras cabezas (2015)
 Destrozares. Canciones para el final de los tiempos (2016)
 Bienvenidos al temporal (2018) (Live album)
 Mayéutica (2021)

Extremoduro
 Rock Transgresivo (1989)
 Somos unos Animales (1991)
 Deltoya (1992)
 ¿Dónde Están Mis Amigos? (1993)
 Pedrá (1995)
 Agila (1996)
 Iros Todos a Tomar por Culo (1997) (Live album)
 Canciones Prohibidas (1998)
 Yo, Minoría Absoluta (2002)
 Grandes éxitos y fracasos (Episodio primero) (2004) (Compilation album)
 Grandes éxitos y fracasos (Episodio segundo) (2004) (Compilation album)
 La Ley Innata (2008)
 Material Defectuoso (2011)
 Para Todos los Públicos (2013)

Extrechinato y Tú
 Poesía básica (2001)

Novels 
 El víaje íntimo de la locura (2009)

Notes

References

Extremoduro
1962 births
Living people
People from Plasencia
Spanish composers
Spanish male composers
Spanish guitarists
Spanish male guitarists
Singers from Extremadura
Spanish rock singers
Rock en Español musicians